Phipps Peak is a mountain in the Sierra Nevada to the west of Emerald Bay and Lake Tahoe; and to the east of Rockbound Valley and the Crystal Range.

Phipps Peak is named after William Phipps, a California pioneer originally from Kentucky that fought in the American Army during the American Indian Wars. He claimed to be a "General" in the Army, though that was a self-proclaimed title. In 1854, he settled in the small settlement of Georgetown, California (named after George Phipps who is unrelated) about 100 miles west of Tahoe, and six years later relocated to McKinney Bay at Lake Tahoe where he settled on a 160-acre homestead near General Creek. Nearby Phipps Pass and General Creek are also named after Phipps.

References 

Mountains of the Desolation Wilderness
Mountains of El Dorado County, California
Mountains of Northern California